The 1818–19 United States Senate elections were held on various dates in various states. As these U.S. Senate elections were prior to the ratification of the Seventeenth Amendment in 1913, senators were chosen by state legislatures. Senators were elected over a wide range of time throughout 1818 and 1819, and a seat may have been filled months late or remained vacant due to legislative deadlock. In these elections, terms were up for the senators in Class 3.

The Democratic-Republican Party gained two seats.  The Federalists had only three seats being contested, of which they lost two and the third was left vacant due to a failure to elect.

Results summary 
Senate party division, 16th Congress (1819–1821)

 Majority party: Democratic-Republican (30–37)
 Minority party: Federalist (9)
 Vacant: 3–0
 Total seats: 42–46

Change in composition

Before the elections 
After the admission of Illinois.

Result of the general elections

Results of the 1819 special elections

Race summaries

Special elections during the 15th Congress 
In these special elections, the winners were seated during 1818 or before March 4, 1819; ordered by election date.

Races leading to the 16th Congress 

In these general elections, the winner was seated on March 4, 1819 (except where noted due to late election); ordered by state.

All of the elections involved the Class 3 seats.

Special elections during the 16th Congress 
In these special elections, the winners were seated in 1819 after March 4; ordered by election date.  The new Congress was seated December 6, 1819, so some of these late-elected senators were seated after that.

Alabama

Connecticut

Georgia

Georgia (regular)

Georgia (specials)

Illinois

Indiana

Kentucky

Kentucky (regular)

Kentucky (special)

Louisiana

Louisiana (regular)

Louisiana (special)

Maryland 

Due to both the Class 3 seat falling vacant at the normal end of the term and the Class 1 seat falling vacant due to the death of Alexander Contee Hanson, the legislature voted for both seats simultaneously. Edward Lloyd received the most votes and won the Class 3 seat. William Pinkney received the second-most votes and won the Class 1 seat.

Massachusetts (special)

New Hampshire

New York

North Carolina

Ohio

Pennsylvania

South Carolina

Tennessee (special)

Vermont

Vermont (regular)

Vermont (special)

Virginia (special)

See also 
 1818 United States elections
 1818–19 United States House of Representatives elections
 16th United States Congress
 17th United States Congress

References 

 Party Division in the Senate, 1789-Present, via Senate.gov